The 2003 California Golden Bears football team was an American football team that represented the University of California, Berkeley in the Pacific-10 Conference (Pac-10) during the 2003 NCAA Division I-A football season. In their second year under head coach Jeff Tedford, the Golden Bears compiled an 8–6 record (5–3 in Pac-10, tied for third) and outscored their opponents 457 to 341.

The Bears were led on the field by sophomore quarterback Aaron Rodgers, a junior college transfer who became the starter on September 20 against Illinois. In his second start the following week, Rodgers led Cal to a 21–7 halftime lead over third-ranked USC before being replaced due to injury in the second half by Reggie Robertson. The Bears won in triple overtime, 34–31. In late December, Cal defeated Virginia Tech 52–49 in the Insight Bowl at Phoenix; Rodgers passed for 394 yards and was the game's offensive MVP.

Rodgers tied Cal's season record with five 300-yard games and set a Cal record for the lowest percentage of passes intercepted at 1.43%. The Golden Bears' statistical leaders included Rodgers with 2,903 passing yards, Adimchinobe Echemandu with 1,195 rushing yards, and Geoff McArthur with 1,504 receiving yards.

Schedule

Game summaries

vs. Kansas State

USC

Source: ESPN
    
    
    
    
    
    
    
    
    
    
    

"They always take us lightly", said receiver Jonathan Makonnen, who had seven catches for 104 yards. "They really don't respect us. They're a talented team, but they were kind of lackadaisical out there."
"I'm not knocking Leinart or their running backs, but I didn't see a whole lot of firepower from them", said Echemandu, the first player to rush for 100 yards against USC in 16 games. "Mike Williams is basically their whole offense."
The loss was USC's last until the 2006 National Championship Game, in which Texas snapped USC's 34-game win streak.
Aaron Rogers was the starter as Cal's quarterback, but due to injury he was replaced in the second half by Reggie Robertson.

Washington

Stanford

Source: ESPN
    
    
    
    
    
    
    

CAL: Aaron Rodgers 26/37, 359 Yds 
CAL: Geoff McArthur 16 Rec, 245 Yds (single game record – Dameane Douglas, 1998) 
CAL: bowl eligible for first time since 1996

Roster

References

California
California Golden Bears football seasons
Guaranteed Rate Bowl champion seasons
California Golden Bears football